is a Japanese politician of the Komeito Party, a member of the House of Representatives in the National Diet (national legislature). A native of Toshima, Tokyo and graduate of the University of Tokyo with the Bachelor of Engineering degree in 1981, he worked at the Ministry of Construction from 1981 to 1992. He was elected to the House of Representatives for the first time in 1993. He was appointed to be the Minister of Land, Infrastructure, Transport and Tourism by Prime Minister Shinzo Abe on 7 October 2015. He was replaced as minister on 11 September 2020 and was subsequently appointed as Secretary-General of Komeito.

Policy
He agreed to amend the constitution of japan.
It is not necessary to review the constitutional interpretation of the cabinet legislation bureau, which prohibits the exercise of the right to collective self-defense.
It agreed to restart nuclear power plants that met the new standards of the nuclear regulatory commission.
Japan opposes its participation in the Trans-Pacific Strategic Economic Partnership (TPP).
It agreed to the establishment of the women's imperial family.
Opposes the prime minister's visit to Yasukuni Shrine.
He opposes the review of the murayama and kono discourses.
It agrees with the act on the protection of specified secrets.

News Report
On August 17, 2021, it was reported that five people, including Toshihiro Nikai (secretary general of the Liberal Democratic Party), had a dinner at a Japanese restaurant in Tokyo (the government is seeking a dinner for no more than four people). Yosuke Takagi, chairman of the Diet Affairs Committee (Komeito), told reporters, "it's not a dinner, we had lunch at 'silent food' ." at a press conference on August 20, Ishii explained, "i'm very sorry," "everyone vaccinated twice, took infection prevention measures, and said, 'I was alert where I thought it would be okay."

References

External links
  in Japanese.

1958 births
Living people
People from Tokyo
University of Tokyo alumni
Members of the House of Representatives (Japan)
New Komeito politicians
Ministers of Land, Infrastructure, Transport and Tourism of Japan
21st-century Japanese politicians